Birkat Al-Mawz is a village in the Ad Dakhiliyah Region of Oman. It is located at the entrance of Wadi al-Muaydin on the southern rim of Jebel Akhdar and home to a restored fort called Bait al Redidah. A road and a walking route through Wadi al-Muaydin up to the Saiq Plateau start from here.

References 

 
 Thouroude, Guillaume (2021). Birkat al Mouz. L'oasis spirituelle du sultanat d'Oman. L'Harmattan. p. 193. ISBN 978-2-343-24080-0
 

Populated places in Oman